The John Sutherland House, located in Eugene, Oregon, is a house listed on the National Register of Historic Places.

See also
 National Register of Historic Places listings in Lane County, Oregon

References

Houses on the National Register of Historic Places in Eugene, Oregon